Ocyale is a wolf spider genus in the family Lycosidae.

Species list
  Alderweireldt, 1996 — Malawi, Namibia
  Roewer, 1960 — Ethiopia
  Strand, 1908 — Madagascar
  Alderweireldt, 1996 — Togo, Congo, Namibia
  (Karsch, 1878) — Tanzania to South Africa
  (Mello-Leitão, 1942) — Peru
  Gajbe, 2004 - Endemic to India
  Dyal, 1935 — Pakistan
  (Karsch, 1879) — Sri Lanka
  (Audouin, 1826) — North Africa
  (Roewer, 1960) — West Africa to Myanmar
  Yin & Peng, 1997 — China

See also
 List of Lycosidae genera

References

External links

Lycosidae
Araneomorphae genera
Spiders of Africa
Spiders of Asia
Spiders of South America